Jassopsaltria is a genus of cicadas in the family Cicadidae, found in Australia. There is at least one described species in Jassopsaltria, J. rufifacies.

Jassopsaltria is the only genus of the tribe Jassopsaltriini.

References

Further reading

 
 
 
 
 
 
 
 
 

Cicadinae
Cicadidae genera